is a Japanese model and actor who is affiliated with Stardust Promotion.

Filmography

TV series

Films

References

 Asaya Kimijima at Wikiinfromer

External links
 Official profile at Stardust Promotion 

Japanese male models
1987 births
Living people
Male actors from Kanagawa Prefecture
Stardust Promotion artists
Models from Kanagawa Prefecture